Major General Sir Walter de Sausmarez Cayley,  (8 August 1863 – 21 July 1952) was a British Army officer who served in Africa towards the end of the 19th century, and later in Mesopotomia and Gallipoli during the First World War.

Family and early life
Walter de Sausmarez Cayley was the eldest son of Henry Cayley, Deputy Surgeon-General with the Bengal Army and honorary surgeon to Queen Victoria and King Edward VII. Among his siblings were Douglas Edward Cayley, who also served with distinction in the Gallipoli Campaign, and Henry Priaulx Cayley, a naval officer who rose to the rank of rear admiral in the Royal Australian Navy. He was born in India in 1863 and baptised at Gorakhpur.

He was educated at Marlborough College and the Royal Military College, Sandhurst.

In 1896 he married Constance Blakeney (1870 to 1966), daughter of the Revd. Richard Paul Blakeney, Rector of Bridlington and a Canon of York Minster.

Army career
In 1883 he joined the West Yorkshire Regiment and served in the Ashanti campaign (1895–1896) in what is now Ghana, which led to the annexation of Ashanti territory by Britain. In 1890 he was promoted to captain. For his part in the Second Boer War he received the Queen's South Africa Medal with three clasps. In 1901 he reached the rank of major. He was subsequently posted to India, taking part in operations on the North-West Frontier in 1908. He was promoted to lieutenant colonel in 1910.

In 1914 he commanded the 39th Infantry Brigade with the rank of brigadier general, and went with the brigade to Gallipoli. After the withdrawal from Gallipoli he took part in the Mesopotamian campaign as commander of the 13th (Western) Division, and remained there until the end of the First World War. He was made a Companion of the Order of the Bath and Companion of the Order of St Michael and St George in 1916, and a Knight Commander of the Order of St Michael and St George in 1917. For his services in the First World War, he was also awarded Serbia's Order of Karađorđe's Star.

Later life
Sir Walter de Sausmarez Cayley retired from the army in 1920. In his last decades he lived at Crowthorne, Berkshire, and in 1939 he was Deputy Lieutenant of Berkshire.

References

1864 births
1952 deaths
British Army generals of World War I
British Army personnel of the Second Boer War
Walter de Sausmarez
Companions of the Order of the Bath
Deputy Lieutenants of Berkshire
Graduates of the Royal Military College, Sandhurst
Knights Commander of the Order of St Michael and St George
West Yorkshire Regiment officers
British Army major generals